Robert James Albert Wall (born December 1, 1942) is a Canadian former professional ice hockey defenceman. Wall played for several teams in the National Hockey League (NHL). Wall was the first team captain of the Los Angeles Kings.

Playing career
Wall was born in Elgin Mills, Ontario. Wall played junior hockey in the Ontario Hockey Association. While playing junior hockey, Wall was part of the 1962 Memorial Cup champion Hamilton Red Wings. 

The majority of his 14 professional seasons were split between the NHL and the World Hockey Association.

Career statistics

Regular season and playoffs

External links

1942 births
Living people
Canadian ice hockey defencemen
Cincinnati Wings players
Detroit Red Wings players
Edmonton Flyers (WHL) players
Edmonton Oilers (WHA) players
Hamilton Red Wings (OHA) players
Hamilton Tiger Cubs players
Sportspeople from Richmond Hill, Ontario
Los Angeles Kings players
Omaha Knights (CHL) players
Pittsburgh Hornets players
Quebec Aces (AHL) players
St. Louis Blues players
San Diego Mariners players
Ice hockey people from Ontario